The Butterfly (French: Le Papillon) in original French, is a film by Philippe Muyl starring Michel Serrault and Claire Bouanich.

Synopsis

Julien, (Serrault) an aging widower, is a passionate butterfly collector.  Elsa, (Claire Bouanich) an eight-year-old girl, lives with her mother, a very young woman named Isabelle, who have both just moved into Julien's apartment building.  The mother is usually away, leaving her daughter alone for long periods of time, and Elsa starts visiting a reluctant Julien.

One day, Julien decides to go to the Vercors plateau in search of a rare butterfly called Isabelle which can live for only 72 hours.  Elsa decides to join his adventure without telling him, and hides in his car. During the search Julien eventually reveals that butterfly collecting was a passion of his son, who died very young.  His son had asked Julien to find the Isabelle butterfly, and so this is why the butterfly was so important to Julien. The story complicates when Elsa's mother cannot find her and hysterically reports her daughter as being missing, and possibly kidnapped. The police send out a search party and rescue helicopter looking for her.

Elsa ends up falling into a hole while traveling with Julien. Julien calls the authorities who come to rescue Elsa. However Julien is suspected of kidnapping and is taken into custody for a short time. A young boy named Sebastian helps get Elsa out of the hole, and she is able to go home with her mother.

When Julien and Elsa come back from their journey to find the Isabelle butterfly, they see that the chrysalis that Julien had received contained the Isabelle butterfly all along. Julien sends the butterfly on its way to visit his deceased son.

It all ends very happily as Julien is released when they realize that he had never kidnapped Elsa. Isabelle, Elsa's mother, allows her to continue seeing Julien and studying butterflies with him. Both Julien, Elsa, and her mother benefit greatly from each other's presence.

External links

2002 films
2002 comedy-drama films
French comedy-drama films
2000s French-language films
2000s French films